Vojtěch Veselý (19 April 1885 – 7 December 1971) was a Czech figure skater. He competed in the mixed pairs event at the 1928 Winter Olympics, along with wife Libuše Veselá.

References

1885 births
1971 deaths
Sportspeople from Kolín
Olympic figure skaters of Czechoslovakia
Figure skaters at the 1928 Winter Olympics
Czech male pair skaters